Saint Darerca of Ireland was a sister of Saint Patrick.

Life
Much obscurity is attached to her history, and it is not easy to disentangle the facts of her history from the network of legend which medieval writers interwove with her acts. Her fame, apart from her relationship to Ireland's national apostle, stands secure as not only a great saint but as the mother of many saints.

When Saint Patrick visited Bredach, as is found in the "Tripartite Life of St. Patrick," he ordained Aengus mac Ailill, the local chieftain of Moville, now a seaside resort for the citizens of Derry. While there he found "the three deacons," his sister's sons, namely, Saint Reat, Saint Nenn, and Saint Aedh, who are commemorated respectively on 3 March, 25 April, and 31 August.

Darerca was at least twice married. Among her husbands, according to histories in Brittany, she was the second wife of Conan Meriadoc and the mother of his eldest son, Gradlon Mawr who became Gradlon the Great, King of Brittany.

Darerca's second husband, Chonas the Briton, founded the church of Both-chonais, now Binnion, Parish of Clonmany, in the barony of Inishowen, County Donegal. She had children by both husbands, some say seventeen sons, all of whom, according to Colgan, became bishops (according to Breton history at least one became King of Brittany, rather than serve the church as a bishop). From the "Tripartite Life of Saint Patrick" it is evident that there were four sons of Darerca by Chonas, namely four bishops, Saint Mel of Ardagh, Saint Rioc of Inisboffin, Saint Muinis of Forgney, County Longford, and Saint Maelchu. It is well to note that another Saint Muinis, son of Gollit, is described as of Tedel in Ara-cliath.

Darerca had two daughters, Saint Eiche of Kilglass and Saint Lalloc of Senlis. Her first husband was Restitutus the Lombard, after whose death she married Chonas the Briton. By Restitutus she was mother of Saint Sechnall of Dunshaughlin; Saint Nectan of Killunche, and of Fennor (near Slane); of Saint Auxilius of Killossey (near Naas, County Kildare); of Saint Diarmaid of Druim-corcortri (near Navan); of Dabonna, Mogornon, Drioc, Luguat, and Coemed Maccu Baird (the Lombard) of Cloonshaneville, near Frenchpark, County Roscommon.

Four other sons are assigned her by old Irish writers, namely Saint Crummin of Lecua, Saint Miduu, Saint Carantoc, and Saint Maceaith.  The latter is identical with Liamania, according to Colgan, but must not be confounded with Saint Monennia, or Darerca, whose feast is on 6 July.

Saint Darerca is honoured on 22 March, and is patroness of Valentia Island.

See also

 Darerca

References

Romano-British saints
Late Ancient Christian female saints
5th-century Irish people
Medieval Irish saints
Female saints of medieval Ireland
5th-century Christian saints
5th-century Irish women